Terence J. Byres is a peasant studies scholar and a professor emeritus of Political Economy at the School of Oriental and African Studies, University of London.  Byres was a founding editor of the Journal of Development Studies (1964), the Journal of Peasant Studies (1973) and  Journal of Agrarian Change (2001).

Selected publications
 Byres, T.J. (1996) Capitalism From Above and Capitalism From Below. An Essay in Comparative Political Economy. London: Macmillan.

Festschrift 
Bernstein, Henry and Brass, Tom (Eds)(1996) Agrarian Questions: Essays in Appreciation of T.J.Byres (Library of Peasant Studies), Routledge (A collection of nine essays was prepared to mark the 60th birthday of Terry Byres)

External links 
 SOAS: Department of Economics: Professorial Research Associate Terry Byres

References 

British sociologists
Development specialists
Living people
Year of birth missing (living people)